Androulakis is a Greek surname. Notable people with this surname include:

 Mimis Androulakis (born 1951), Greek author and politician
 Nikos Androulakis (born 1979), Greek politician

Greek-language surnames